Ann Flora Froude Flashman (Lady Rylah), (1911 - March 1969) was an Australian veterinarian. She was the first woman to enrol in the University of Sydney School of Veterinary Science and the first paid veterinarian at the Lort Smith Animal Hospital in North Melbourne which had previously been an honorary role held by Belle Bruce Reid.

Veterinary career
Upon Flashman's graduation in 1935, where she was awarded the S.T.D. Symons Memorial Prize, she became the second woman to graduate from University of Sydney School of Veterinary Science, due to repeating a year, and the fourth woman in Australia to qualify as a veterinarian following Belle Bruce Reid, Margaret Gwendoline Keats and Patricia Littlejohn. After her relocation to Melbourne, Flashman became the third woman veterinarian in Victoria. From 1939 until her death in 1969, Flashman ran a private practice focused on treating cats, dogs and birds from her veterinary surgery and home which had been specially designed by the architectural firm of R.H. and M.H. King, and built by W. Davis, at 15 Victor Avenue, Kew.

Publications
Flashman was a contributor to the Australian Veterinary Journal throughout her career writing as A. F. Flashman.

She was also the author of a number of books, Where Eagles Nested (1956), The Australian Pet Book (1962) and The Australian Dog Book (1971) under the pseudonym of John Wotherspoon and wrote a column, Pet Talk, in The Herald until the 1960s.

In 1963, she wrote Australian adventure: girl guiding under the Southern Cross under the name of Ann Rylah.

Girl Guides
Flashman joined the Girl Guides in 1925. She was a lifelong member and supporter who held a number of roles, including Commissioner.

Personal life 
Flashman was born in Sydney and was the only daughter of Dr. James Froude Flashman and Irene Flora Flashman (née Dewar) and the sister of Dr. James Alan Froude Flashman.

She married Arthur Rylah in Melbourne on 10 September 1937 and they had two children, Annabel and Michael.

Following Flashman's death, her veterinary practice was continued by her daughter, Annabel, and her husband Lindsay Brownell for thirty years.

References

1911 births
1969 deaths
Australian veterinarians
Women veterinarians